Qasemabad (also Romanized as Qāsemābād; also known as Ghasem Abad Ramjerd and Qāsemābād-e Rāmjerd) is a village in Ramjerd-e Yek Rural District, in the Central District of Marvdasht County, Fars Province, Iran. At the 2006 census, its population was 760, in 174 families.

References 

Populated places in Marvdasht County